Maria Irene Stencel (January 11, 1900 – April 6, 1985) was a registered nurse from Poland who was a recipient of the International Florence Nightingale Medal in 1961.

Early life 
Stencel was born on January 11, 1900, in Jekaterynosław.

Career in nursing 
Stencel worked in a military hospital as the head of the auxiliary nurses of the Polish Red Cross from 1930 to 1939. She then became director of emergency services. Stencel took the position of Director of the School of Nursing at Łódź in 1946.

During World War Two, Stencel organised relief to nurses who were threatened with deportation from Poland.

Stencel was one of the founders of the Polish Nursing Association, Lodz Branch, that was established in November 1956.

Later life and death 
Stencel died on April 6, 1985, in Łódź.

References 

Polish nurses
1900 births
1985 deaths
Florence Nightingale Medal recipients